Say Yes is a 2001 South Korean psychological thriller film.

Plot 
Young married couple Yoon-hee and Jung-hyun go on a road trip, and along the way they pick up a lone drifter, Em (or M) to aid him so he does not crash and get hurt. 

Although M acts kind to the couple at first, as time goes on M turns out to be a violent and sadistic psychopath who torments and abuses the couple, who try in vain to escape him. 

After capturing Jung-hyun, M gives him a choice: submit to torture and eventual death or watch and allow M to kill Yoon-hee.

Cast 
 Park Joong-hoon ... M
 Chu Sang-mi ... Yoon-hee
 Kim Joo-hyuk ... Jung-hyun
 Gi Ju-bong ... Manager
 Lee Chan-young ... Detective
 Hwang In-seong
 Park Yong-woo
 Kim Chae-yeon
 Lee Seok-gu
 Kim Jong-min
 Ryu Seung-soo

Release 
Say Yes was released in South Korea on 17 August 2001, and received a total of 55,200 admissions in Seoul.

See also
The Hitcher, a 1986 psychological thriller with a similar premise

References

External links 
 
 

2001 films
2000s crime thriller films
2000s psychological thriller films
2001 thriller films
2000s chase films
2000s road movies
South Korean horror thriller films
Films about hitchhiking
2000s Korean-language films
South Korean thriller films
2000s South Korean films